Coffee Creek is an unincorporated community in Morgan County, Kentucky, United States.

References

Unincorporated communities in Morgan County, Kentucky
Unincorporated communities in Kentucky